Yannick Botrel (born 9 December 1951) is a former member of the Senate of France, representing the Côtes-d'Armor department.  He is a member of the Socialist Party.

References
Page on the Senate website

1951 births
Living people
Socialist Party (France) politicians
French Senators of the Fifth Republic
Senators of Côtes-d'Armor
Mayors of places in Brittany